This is a list of electoral division results for the Australian 2007 federal election for the Australian Capital Territory and the Northern Territory.
__toc__

Australian Capital Territory

Canberra

Fraser

Northern Territory

Lingiari

Solomon

See also 
 Members of the Australian House of Representatives, 2007–2010

References 

Territories 2007